Chilton Trinity School is a coeducational secondary school located at Chilton Trinity, Bridgwater, Somerset, England.

Bridgwater was selected as the 1st town in the South West level to be selected for the UK governments Building Schools for the Future initiative, which aimed to rebuild and renew nearly every secondary school in England. Within Bridgwater, Building Schools for the Future was to develop all of the 4 secondary schools along with 2 special provision schools, Elmwood School and Penrose School at an expected cost of around £100 Million. This included the complete relocation and rebuilding of a new school combining both the Haygrove and Penrose Schools.

In July 2010, several components of the scheme for Bridgwater schools were cancelled and others were still under discussion.

Previously a foundation school administered by Somerset County Council, in September 2019 Chilton Trinity School converted to academy status. The school is now sponsored by the Clevedon Learning Trust.

References

External links 
 School web site

Secondary schools in Somerset
Academies in Somerset